M. G. Subramaniam (5 November 1931 – 19 July 1993) was an Indian cricket umpire. He stood in two Test matches and one ODI game in 1983.

See also
 List of Test cricket umpires
 List of One Day International cricket umpires

References

1931 births
1993 deaths
Place of birth missing
Indian Test cricket umpires
Indian One Day International cricket umpires